The 1934 Phillip Island 100 was a motor race staged at the Phillip Island circuit in Victoria, Australia on 1 January 1934.
The 100 mile race, which was organised by the Light Car Club of Australia, was attended by over 8,000 people.
It was contested on a handicap basis with the limit starter, JW Williamson, commencing the race 17 minutes before the scratch starter, WB Thompson.
A competitor had to complete the course within the prescribed time limit of 1¾ hours to be classified as a finisher.

The race was won by JW Williamson driving a Riley.

Race results

Notes
 Starters: 17
 Classified finishers: 7
 Unclassified: 3 (All were on their last lap when the time limit expired)
 Retirements: 7
 Fastest lap: WB Thompson, time unknown, (average speed of approximately 83 mph)
 Fastest time: JO McCutcheon, 80 minutes 27 seconds

References

Phillip Island 100
Motorsport at Phillip Island